William Stapper (fl. 1386), of Reading, Berkshire, was an English politician.

Family
Stapper married Elizabeth, and they had a son, Stephen Stapper, also an MP. In his poll tax information from 1379, he is shown as already married and his occupation is given as weaver.

Career
He was a Member (MP) of the Parliament of England for Reading in 1386.

References

Year of birth missing
Year of death missing
English MPs 1386
People from Reading, Berkshire
Members of the Parliament of England (pre-1707) for Reading